UFC Fight Night: Assunção vs. Moraes 2 (also known as UFC Fight Night 144 or UFC on ESPN+ 2) was a mixed martial arts event produced by the Ultimate Fighting Championship that was held on February 2, 2019 at Centro de Formação Olímpica do Nordeste in Fortaleza, Brazil.

Background
The event marked the third that the promotion has hosted in the state capital of Ceará, following UFC on Fuel TV: Nogueira vs. Werdum in June 2013, and UFC Fight Night: Belfort vs. Gastelum in March of 2017.

A rematch between Raphael Assunção and former WSOF Bantamweight Champion Marlon Moraes served as the event headliner. The pairing previously met in June 2017 at UFC 212 with Assunção winning the fight via split decision.

As a result of the cancellation of UFC 233, a middleweight bout between Markus Perez and promotional newcomer Anthony Hernandez was rescheduled for this event.

A strawweight bout between Marina Rodriguez and Alexa Grasso was scheduled to take place at this event. However, it was reported on December 17 that Rodriguez pulled out of the event due to a hand injury. The pair was rescheduled to UFC on ESPN: Barboza vs. Gaethje.

Dmitry Sosnovskiy was scheduled to face Junior Albini at the event. However Sosnovskiy pulled out of the fight in early January after undergoing surgery to correct a recent injury. Albini instead faced promotional newcomer Jairzinho Rozenstruik.

At the weigh-ins, Sarah Frota and former WSOF Flyweight Champion Magomed Bibulatov both missed the required weight for their respective fights. Frota weighed in at 123 pounds, 7 pounds over the strawweight non-title fight limit of 116. Meanwhile, Bibulatov weighed in at 127 pounds, 1 pound over the flyweight non-title fight limit of 126. Bibulatov was fined 20 percent of his purse, which went to his opponent Rogério Bontorin, while Frota surrendered 40 percent of her purse to former Invicta FC Strawweight Champion Lívia Renata Souza.

Results

Bonus awards
The following fighters were awarded $50,000 bonuses:
Fight of the Night: None awarded 
Performances of the Night: Marlon Moraes, José Aldo, Charles Oliveira and Johnny Walker

See also 

 List of UFC events
 2019 in UFC
 List of current UFC fighters

References 

UFC Fight Night
2019 in mixed martial arts
Sport in Fortaleza
Mixed martial arts in Brazil
February 2019 sports events in South America